Zoutpansberg girdled lizard (Smaug depressus) is a species of the genus Smaug. This species is only found on and around the Soutpansberg in South Africa and was before considered a subspecies of Warren's girdled lizard. Zoutpansberg girdled lizard's grow to a length up to 16 centimeters.

Reproduction
To prevent females of getting away at the first approach, the male approaches the female during mating season very cautiously. He nods his head constantly to make its peaceful intentions cognizable. After mating it takes six months before two to five young are born.

References

Smaug (genus)
Taxa named by Vivian Frederick Maynard FitzSimons
Lizards of Africa
Reptiles of South Africa
Reptiles described in 1930